Ivanhoe railway station may refer to:

 Ivanhoe railway station, New South Wales, a railway station in Ivanhoe, New South Wales, Australia
 Ivanhoe railway station, Melbourne, a railway station in Melbourne, Victoria, Australia
 Ivanhoe (Metra station), a commuter rail station on the Metra Electric main branch in Riverdale, Illinois